Teletón, Spanish for telethon, may refer to:
Teletón (Chile), an annual Chilean telethon
Teletón (Mexico), an annual Mexican telethon
Teletón USA; see Teletón (Mexico)#Teletón USA
Teletón El Salvador